Elisha Cooper is an American writer and children's book author. Cooper went to Foote School and Hopkins School in Connecticut. After graduating from Yale, he worked for The New Yorker as a messenger. In 2016 he was a Maurice Sendak Fellow, a residency program for illustrators.

Cooper is the author of the memoirs Falling: A Daughter, a Father, and a Journey Back, ridiculous/hilarious/terrible/cool: A Year in an American High School, and Crawling: A Father's First Year, and several sketchbooks.

Children's books include 8: An Animal Alphabet, Train, Farm, Homer, Beaver Is Lost, Ice Cream, Ballpark, Building, Dance!, Magic Thinks Big, A Good Night Walk, and Beach.

Dance! was a New York Times Ten Best Illustrated winner in 2001.  Beach was a Society of Illustrators Gold Medal best illustrated book of the year in 2006. A New York Times Book Review said of Magic Thinks Big, "Elisha Cooper's watercolors, like his sentences, are simple and quiet and essentially perfect." His book Big Cat, Little Cat was a Caldecott Honor book in 2018. River won the Robin Smith Picture Book Prize in 2020.

He currently lives in New York City with his wife and two daughters.

Bibliography

Books
Non-fiction
A Year in New York, 1995
Off the Road: An American Sketchbook, 1996
A Day At Yale, 1998
California: A Sketchbook, 2000
Crawling: A Father's First Year, 2006
ridiculous/hilarious/terrible/cool: A Year in an American High School, 2008
Falling: A Daughter, a Father, and a Journey Back, 2016

Picture Books
Country Fair, 1997; 1998 Charlotte Zolotow Award Commendation 
Ballpark. 1998
Building, 1999
Henry: A Dog's Life, 1999
Dance!, 2001 - New York Times Best Illustrated Book of the Year, 2001
Ice Cream, 2002
Magic Thinks Big, 2004
A Good Night Walk, 2005
Bear Dreams. 2006
Beach, 2006
Beaver Is Lost, 2010
Farm, 2010
Homer, 2012
Train, 2013
8: An Animal Alphabet, 2015; 2016 Mathical Book Prize 
Big Cat, Little Cat, 2017; 2018 Caldecott Honor, 2018 Charlotte Zolotow Award Commendation 
River, 2019
Yes & No, 2021

References

External links
 Official Website at elishacooper.com
 Elisha Cooper at Scholastic Books
 Elisha Cooper at AuthorTracker
 Elisha Cooper biography on Answers.com

1971 births
Living people
American children's writers
American writers of young adult literature
American memoirists
American non-fiction writers
Writers who illustrated their own writing